Isla Ballena, is an island in the Gulf of California east of the Baja California Peninsula. The island is uninhabited and is part of the La Paz Municipality.

Biology
Isla Ballena has five species of reptiles: Phyllodactylus unctus (San Lucan leaf-toed gecko), Sauromalus ater (common chuckwalla), Sceloporus hunsakeri (Hunsaker's spiny lizard), Urosaurus nigricauda (black-tailed brush lizard), and Uta stansburiana (common side-blotched lizard).

References

Further reading

External links
https://archive.today/20141003010423/http://www.mbendi.com/attraction/isla-ballena-1915170

Islands of the Gulf of California
Islands of Baja California Sur
Uninhabited islands of Mexico